James Letcher "Jay" Mitchell (born August 26, 1976) is an American lawyer from Alabama and is an associate justice of the Supreme Court of Alabama.  His term of office began on January 11, 2019.

Early life and education 

Mitchell was born August 26, 1976, in Mobile, Alabama. He received his Bachelor of Arts with honors from Birmingham–Southern College. He received his J.D. degree from the University of Virginia School of Law.

Legal career 

Prior to serving on the Alabama Supreme Court, Mitchell was a partner with Maynard, Cooper & Gale.

Alabama Supreme Court 

On June 5, 2016, Mitchell announced his intent to run for the seat on the Alabama Supreme Court being vacated by James Allen Main. He defeated his Republican rival in the primary and went on to win the general election in November, defeating Democratic candidate Donna Smalley, 60.5%–39.4%.

Personal life 

He is married to his wife, Elizabeth; they reside in Homewood with their four children. He is a lifelong Republican and a member of the Federalist Society.

References

External links 

1976 births
Living people
20th-century American lawyers
21st-century American lawyers

Alabama Republicans
Birmingham–Southern College alumni
Federalist Society members
Lawyers from Mobile, Alabama

University of Virginia School of Law alumni